John Dyne (died 1412/13) was an English politician, landowner and merchant involved in shipping.

Family
He married a woman named Margery and probably had two sons, including Thomas Dyne. His wife outlived him.

Career
He attended Richard II's coronation. He was a Member (MP) of the Parliament of England for Hythe in October 1377, 1381, February 1383, 1385, February 1388, January 1390, 1395 and January 1397.

References

14th-century births
1413 deaths
15th-century English people
English MPs October 1377
English MPs 1381
English MPs February 1383
English MPs 1385
English MPs February 1388
English MPs January 1390
English MPs January 1397
English MPs 1395